Tragus can mean:

 Hieronymus Bock's Latinized name
 Tragus (ear), a small pointed eminence of the outer ear
 Tragus (plant), a genus of grass
 Tragus (river), a river of Arcadia, Ancient Greece
 Tragus Group, a UK limited company operating restaurants - renamed to Casual Dining Group in 2015

The name comes the Ancient Greek , meaning 'goat'.